Autumn in New York is an album recorded in 1954 by jazz guitarist Tal Farlow.

Track listing

Personnel
 Tal Farlow – guitar
 Gerald Wiggins – piano
 Ray Brown – double bass
 Chico Hamilton – drums

References

1954 albums
Tal Farlow albums